The city known in English as Chittagong has undergone changes in both its official and popular names worldwide. The choice of names stems from the Chittagonian culture, language and colonisation. A reason for the city having a number of names is due to the diverse history of Chittagong.

Bengali and Chittagonian names

The Bengali word for Chittagong, Chottogram (চট্টগ্রাম), has the suffix "-gram" (গ্রাম) meaning village in Standard Bengali, and the word "chotto" could be from "chati" meaning lamp. A legend dates the name to the spread of Islam, when a Muslim lit a chati (lamp) at the top of a hill in the city and called out (Azaan) for people to come to prayer. Thus, many people continue to call the city, চাটিগ্রাম (Chatigram) or in the Chittagonian language, চাটিগাঁও (Chatigaon), গাঁও (Gaon) meaning village. Other names include চাটগাঁ (Chatga), চৈট্ট্যভূমি (Chaityabhumi) and চট্টলা (Chottola). Names such as Chatagao are still used in Hindi, Urdu, Punjabi, Chittagonian and other Bengali dialects today.
The name Sitagang is also common in Eastern dialects with "gang" also meaning village.

Arabic names
Arab traders saw well-developed currency, banking and shipping in Chittagong during the 9th century. Early cosmopolitan Muslims established dominance over the port as an entrepot of maritime trade. Geographically, the Ganges Delta is located in Bengal. The Arabic word Shaṭṭ (شط) meaning delta, could also be an etymology of Chittagong, the Ganges delta, Shaṭṭ Al-Ghānj (شط الغانج). The Moroccan traveller, Ibn Battuta referred to the Port of Chittagong as Sadkāwān (سدكاوان). However, currently the Arabic word for Chittagong is Sheeṭaghungh (شيتاغونغ).

Burmese names
Chittagong was an important port city in the Kingdom of Mrauk U, after Arakan's independence from the Bengal Sultanate. The Burmese tradition of the city's etymology, is that an Arakanese king, invading in the 9th century, gave the city the name Tsit-ta-gung (to make war is improper).

Portuguese and Dutch names

The Portuguese referred to the port city as Porto Grande de Bengala, which meant "the Grand Harbor of Bengal". The term was often simplified as Porto Grande. Other names include Xatigan from the Dutch, Xetigam, and Chatigão from an early Bengali name.

Historical names and nicknames

The Mughal conquest of Chittagong re-established Bengali control and ushered an era of stability and trade. The city was renamed as Islamabad (City of Islam) and continues to be used in the old city.

According to Roman historian Pliny the Elder, the Port of Chittagong is mentioned in the Periplus of the Erythraean Sea as গঙ্গাবাজার (Gongabazaar) meaning "the Market of the Ganges". The location described is most likely located in Sitakunda, Sitakunda Upazila.

In ancient Tibetan texts, the city was known as জ্বালনধারা (Jaalondhaara), and in Arab geographical texts as সামন্দর (Samandar).

The city is known in Bangladesh as বাংলাদেশের প্রবেশদ্বার / Bangladesher Probeshdaar (Bangladesh's Gateway) as well as বাংলাদেশের বাণিজ্যিক রাজধানী / Bangladesher Banijjik Rajdhani (Bangladesh's Commercial Capital).

See also
 History of Chittagong
 Port of Chittagong
 Portuguese Bengal
 Dutch Bengal

References 

Chittagong